The seventeenth series of Made in Chelsea, a British structured-reality television programme began airing on 25 March 2019, and concluded on 17 June 2019 following thirteen episodes, making this the longest series to date. Ahead of the series it was announced that Sam Thompson, Louise Thompson, Ryan Libbey, Ollie Locke, Emily Blackwell, Tristan Phipps and Heloise "Ell" Agostinelli had decided to quit the series, and was the first series to include new cast members Amelia Mist, Angus Findlay, Freddie Browne, Hugo Leefe, Maeva D'Ascanio, Ollie Buck, Rosi Mai Waldon, Sammy Allsop and Verity Scarlett Bowditch.

This series focused on the tit-for-tat behaviour between exes Miles and Maeva. It also included Amelia and Verity on the quest for love, Jamie and Habbs realising they have fallen for each other before facing a number of difficulties, and the breakdown of Miles and James's friendship following the ultimate betrayal.

Cast

Episodes

{| class="wikitable plainrowheaders" style="width:100%; background:#fff;"
! style="background:#2E2EFE;"| Seriesno.
! style="background:#2E2EFE;"| Episodeno.
! style="background:#2E2EFE;"| Title
! style="background:#2E2EFE;"| Original air date
! style="background:#2E2EFE;"| Duration
! style="background:#2E2EFE;"| UK viewers

|}

Ratings
Catch-up service totals were added to the official ratings.

External links

References

2019 British television seasons
Made in Chelsea seasons